Doniach is a surname. Notable people with the surname include:

Deborah Doniach (1912–2004), clinical immunologist and pioneer in the field of autoimmune diseases
Israel Doniach M.D., F.R.C.P. (1911–2001), pathologist and expert on the causes and diagnosis of thyroid cancers
Nakdimon S. Doniach OBE (1907–1994), lexicographer and scholar of Judaic and Semitic languages
Sebastian Doniach (born 1934), British-American physicist and professor at Stanford University